District Hospital, Agra is a government-run hospital in Agra, India. It is located at Mahatma Gandhi Rd, Chhipitola, Rakabganj, Agra, Uttar Pradesh 282001. It serves the Agra district of the Uttar Pradesh state, India.

As of 2016, the hospital has 112 beds, including 100 general, 12 emergency and 6 private. The staff strength is 160, which includes 56 doctors, 44 paramedical personnel and 60 others. The doctors include 53 specialists.

It is recognised by the Medical Council of India under the Medical Council of India Act, 1956. The Lady Lyall (L.L.) Hospital in Agra is attached to District Hospital, Agra for Obstretrics and Gynecology departments.

References

Hospitals in Uttar Pradesh
Buildings and structures in Agra
Hospitals with year of establishment missing